Wranglers Roost Stagecoach Stop is located in New River, Maricopa County, Arizona.  It was a stagecoach stop for a short time in the late 1800s.  In 1930, Carl Jesse Myers (called himself Chief Myers) built WR in the 1930s as a dude ranch. The dude ranch was successful all through the 1930s when times were tough. The original rock structure was added onto in the late 1960s and became a resort with a pool, hot tub, restaurant and some hotel accommodations. The current owners, Reid and Heidi Stewart, also rent the structure for the celebrations of weddings.

Gallery

References

External links

Ghost towns in Arizona
Former populated places in Maricopa County, Arizona